The 1948 Calgary Stampeders finished in first place in the W.I.F.U. with a perfect 12–0 record, went 2–0–1 in the playoffs and won the Grey Cup.

To date, this is still the only undefeated season in the history of Canadian professional football.

Regular season

Season standings

Season schedule

Playoffs

Finals

Calgary won the total-point series 21–10, thus advancing to the Grey Cup game.

Grey Cup

References

Calgary Stampeders seasons
Grey Cup championship seasons
N. J. Taylor Trophy championship seasons
1948 Canadian football season by team